Martins Ferry Times Leader (also known as The Times Leader) is the daily newspaper serving Martins Ferry, Ohio. The Times Leader is published each afternoon, Saturday, and Sunday mornings.

Newspapers published in Ohio
Belmont County, Ohio